Santa is a 1943 Mexican romantic drama film directed by Norman Foster and Alfredo Gómez de la Vega. It stars Esther Fernández, José Cibrián, and Ricardo Montalban.

References

External links
 

1943 films
Mexican romantic drama films
1943 romantic drama films
Mexican black-and-white films
Films directed by Norman Foster
1940s Mexican films